For other ships of this name, see Sweepstake (disambiguation)

Sweepstakes (also known as Sweeps) was a Canadian schooner built in Burlington, Ontario, in 1867. It was damaged off Cove Island, then towed to Big Tub Harbour in the Georgian Bay of Lake Huron, where it sank in September 1885. The remains of Sweepstakes lie in Big Tub Harbour, in the Fathom Five National Marine Park, in Tobermory, Ontario.  The schooner is said to be one of the most popular of several wrecks in the park, and it is often visited by tour boat passengers, divers, and snorkelers.

Construction 
Sweepstakes was built in Burlington, Ontario, in 1867, by Melancthon Simpson. The two-masted wooden schooner’s length was 36.3 m (119 ft) and the hull’s maximum depth was 7 m (20 ft). The schooner weighed approximately 218 tonnes. Sweepstakes was last owned by George Stewart, who lived in Mooretown, Ontario.

Sinking
Damaged off Cove Island in August 1885, the Sweepstakes was then towed to the head of Big Tub Harbour, in the Fathom Five National Marine Park, in Tobermory Ontario, by a tugboat known as Jessie. The schooner suffered serious damage and was not repaired in time, causing it to sink in September 1885. Sweepstakes was transporting coal, and the coal was retrieved after the boat sank.

The wreck today
Today, Sweepstakes is said to be picture perfect, where the hull remains intact. Sweepstakes is located approximately 50 yards from the head of Big Tub Harbour and remains in the water at a depth of 20 feet. The bow area of the boat contains the windlass and portions of the starboard railings remain unharmed. The stern name-board has been removed and currently is on display at the Bruce County Museum in Southampton.  In the middle of the schooner is the center-board box, with the centerboard inside. This extends from keel to deck. The aft-deck of the Sweepstakes has collapsed, causing the stern-post to fall, where it now lies on the bottom of Big Tub Harbour. The Fathom Five National Marine Park has made repairs to the slowly deteriorating schooner to keep the deck from collapsing. Although Sweepstakes deteriorates a little more each year, it is said to be one of the best preserved 19th-century Great Lakes schooners that has been found and is considered one of the most popular shipwrecks in the Fathom Five National Marine Park.  Nearby is another popular visited shipwreck, the City of Grand Rapids. The schooner gives a good depiction of what a typical Great Lakes schooner looked like.  Contrary to previous advisories when entering the shipwreck, this must be done with caution; entry of the schooner is no longer accessible to divers. The Fathom Five National Marine Park officials have put up fencing to prevent entry into the schooner. This reduces any further damage to the schooner which could be caused by the exhaled bubbles of the divers.

References
Canada, Parks. 2008. "Parks Canada: Diving". Parks Canada. Accessed January 14, 2009.
Chamber of Commerce, Tobermory. "Tobermory Visitor Information Centre: Shipwrecks". Black Wolf Technical Solutions. Accessed January 14, 2009.
Folkes, Patrick. 1969. "Shipwrecks of Tobermory 1828-1935". Willowdale: Patrick Folkes.
Salen, Rick. 1985. "The Tobermory Shipwrecks." Tobermory: The Mariner Chart Shop.
Wilson, Tom. "Ontario Scuba Diving: Sweepstakes". Accessed January 17, 2009.

Footnotes 

Shipwrecks of Lake Huron
Merchant ships of Canada
Maritime incidents in September 1885
1867 ships
Ships built in Ontario